The 2017 Dynamic Klagenfurt Open, was the fourth Euro Tour 9-Ball pool event in 2017. The event was won by Germany's Ralf Souquet who defeated another German Sebastian Ludwig 9–7 in the final.

Tournament format
The event saw a total of 142 players compete, in a double-elimination knockout tournament, until the last 32 stage; where the tournament was contested as single elimination.

Prize fund

Tournament results

References

External links

Euro Tour
Sporting events in Austria
2017 Euro Tour events